The 2010 PartyPoker.net European Championship was the third edition of the PDC tournament, the European Championship, which allows the top European players to compete against the highest ranked players from the PDC Order of Merit. The tournament took place at the Stadthalle Dinslaken in Dinslaken, Germany, from 29 July–1 August 2010, featuring a field of 32 players and £200,000 in prize money, with £50,000 going to the winner.

World number one Phil Taylor once again successfully defended the title after an 11-1 demolition of Wayne Jones, who played his first ever televised final.

Prize money

Qualification
The top 16 players from the PDC Order of Merit after the World Series of Darts Festival in Las Vegas automatically qualified for the event. The top 8 from these rankings were also the seeded players. The remaining 16 places went to the top 8 non-qualified players from the 2010 Continental Europe Order of Merit, and then to the top 8 non-qualified players from the 2010 Players Championship Order of Merit.

Draw and results
Draw and schedule of play as follows:

Scores after player's names are three-dart averages (total points scored divided by darts thrown and multiplied by 3)

Statistics

Television coverage
The PDC announced on 20 May 2010 that UK entertainment channel Bravo would broadcast the entire event live. This was the first and only time that Bravo televised live darts before the channel closed in 2011.

The German television channel SPORT1 also broadcast the event.

References

External links
European Championship page on the PDC's official website

European Championship (darts)
European Championship Darts